Neshkan may refer to:
Neshkan, Russia, a rural locality in Chukotka Autonomous Okrug, Russia
Neshkān, alternative name of Neshkash, a village in Iran